Lake Onalaska is a reservoir located on the Black River and Mississippi River between Wisconsin, and Minnesota.

History
Thomas G. Rowe (New York) and John C. Laird (Pennsylvania) platted the village of Onalaska, together, in 1851. Rowe chose the name from a poem by Thomas Campbell called "The Pleasures of Hope" published in 1799. The line "The wolf's long howl from Oonalaska's shore," inspired his choice.
The village, located in a heavy river-access area, became important in the lumber industry.

In the 1930s, as a series of Lock and Dam systems were being implemented throughout the Upper Mississippi area, Lock and Dam No. 7 was built to dam the Black River, creating the reservoir Lake Onalaska.

The name for Lake Onalaska is derived from the name of the village (now city) of Onalaska and the rural town of Onalaska, both of which border the shores of the lake. Lake Roosevelt and Lake Leisure were, at one time, both considered possible names for what is now known as Lake Onalaska.

Today
Lake Onalaska is a popular upper Mississippi destination that attracts visitors year round. Summer visitors enjoy a variety of activities from waterskiing, boating, windsurfing, fishing to beach picnics and bird-watching. The lake contains a variety of migratory waterfowl, and fish, including Northern Pike, Bluegill, Crappie, Walleye and Large and Smallmouth Bass.

The LaCrosse Sailing Club is on the most northern tip of French Island, which is at the south end of the Lake.

In the fall, the bluffs surrounding the Mississippi River and Lake Onalaska explode into rich tones of reds and golds, drawing tourists from across the country.

In the winter, when the lake freezes over and the ice fishing season begins, Lake Onalaska is often dotted with dozens of tents. And when the ice is right, there may be ice boats sailing.

In 2018, the Wisconsin state record Spotted sucker was caught in Lake Onalaska.

The Raptor Resource Project  is located in Decorah, Iowa. They host a  livestreamed webcam called the Mississippi River Flyway Cam. It is at Lake Onalaska in the Upper Mississippi River National Wildlife and Fish Refuge. It shows migrating birds and river wildlife, including Bald Eagles, American White Pelicans, Sandhill Cranes, Caspian Terns, Cormorants and many species of ducks, gulls, and other waterfowl.

Notes

External links
Brice Prairie Conservation Association

Bodies of water of La Crosse County, Wisconsin
Reservoirs in Wisconsin
Lakes of the Mississippi River
Tourist attractions in La Crosse County, Wisconsin